Radix is a genus of air-breathing freshwater snails, aquatic pulmonate gastropods in the family Lymnaeidae, the pond snails.

The genus Radix has a Palaearctic distribution.

Phylogeny 
Correa et al. (2010) confirmed that the placement of these species within the genus Radix reflected their phylogenetic relationship. A cladogram showing phylogenic relations of species in the genus Radix:

The haploid number of chromosomes of all species in the genus Radix is 17 (n=17).

Species 
The taxonomic status of certain species in the genus Radix has been disputed. Remigio (2002) reported sequence divergence within the 16S mitochondrial gene of Radix peregra and Radix ovata. Furthermore, the shell morphology and alloenzyme data indicated that Radix peregra and Radix ovata are distinct.

In contrast, Bargues et al. (2001) considered, on the basis of ITS-2 sequence analysis, that R. peregra, R. ovata, and R. balthica are in fact conspecific.

  † Radix (Lytostoma) grammica (Brusina, 1872)
 Radix acuminata (Lamarck, 1822)
 † Radix alta Macaleț, 2000
 † Radix alutae (Jekelius, 1932) 
 † Radix amaradica Macaleț, 2000 
 Radix ampla (Hartmann, 1821)
 Radix andersoniana (Nevill, 1881)
 Radix auricularia (Linnaeus, 1758) - type species
 Radix auricularia japonica Jay, 1857 - at Japanese Wikipedia
 Radix bactriana (Annandale & Prashad, 1919)
 † Radix balatonica (Fuchs, 1870)
 Radix balthica (Linnaeus, 1758)
 † Radix berbestiensis Macaleț, 2000 
 † Radix bogdanensis Macaleț, 2000
 Radix brevicauda (G. B. Sowerby II, 1872)
 † Radix calavardensis (Bukowski, 1896) 
 † Radix croatica (Gorjanović-Kramberger, 1890) 
 † Radix cucuronensis (Fontannes, 1878) 
 † Radix dilatata (Noulet, 1854) 
 † Radix dilleri (Neumayr, 1883) 
 † Radix enzenbachensis Neubauer & Harzhauser in Harzhauser et al., 2014 
 † Radix extensa (Gorjanović-Kramberger, 1890)
 Radix gebleri (Middendorff, 1851)
 Radix gedrosiana (Annandale & Prashad, 1919)
 Radix hordeum (Mousson, 1874)
 Radix hubrechti Qian, Yang & He, 2012
 † Radix impressa (Sinzov, 1875)
 Radix iranica (Annandale & Prashad, 1919)
 † Radix jaksici (Brusina, 1902) 
 Radix jordii Altaba, 2007
 Radix kamtschatica (Middendorff, 1851) 
 † Radix kobelti (Brusina, 1884) 
 † Radix korlevici (Brusina, 1884) 
 † Radix kurelaci (Brusina, 1902) 
 Radix labiata (Rossmässler, 1835)
 † Radix laevigata (Eichwald, 1853)
 Radix lagotis (Schrank, 1803)
 † Radix lazarevici (Brusina, 1902) 
 Radix lilli Glöer & Beckmann, 2007
 Radix linae Altaba, 2007
 Radix luteola (Lamarck, 1822)
 † Radix lytostomopsis (Brusina, 1902)
 † Radix macaleti Neubauer, Harzhauser, Kroh, Georgopoulou & Mandic, 2014 
 † Radix marinescui Macaleț, 2000
 † Radix minutissima (Greppin, 1855) 
 Radix namucuoensis Qian, Yang & He, 2012
 Radix natalensis (Krauss, 1848)
 † Radix navarroi (Royo Gómez, 1922) 
 † Radix novorossica (Sinzov, 1877) 
 † Radix obtusissima (Deshayes, 1838) 
 Radix ovata (Draparnaud, 1805) = Radix balthica (Linnaeus, 1758) 
 † Radix papaianopoli Macaleț, 2000 
 † Radix paucispira (Fuchs, 1870) 
 Radix peregra (O. F. Müller, 1774) = Radix labiata (Rossmässler, 1835)
 † Radix pergamenica (Oppenheim, 1919) 
 Radix persica (Issel, 1865)
 † Radix phrygoovata (Oppenheim, 1919) 
 Radix pinteri  Schütt, 1974
 † Radix plicata (Sacco, 1884) 
 † Radix podarensis Macaleț, 2000
 † Radix pseudoovata (d'Orbigny, 1852) 
 Radix relicta  Polinski, 1929
 † Radix rippensis (Almera & Bofill y Poch, 1895) 
 Radix rubiginosa (Michelin, 1831)
  † Radix simplex (Gorjanović-Kramberger, 1899)
 † Radix socialis (von Zieten, 1832) 
 † Radix subauricularia (d'Orbigny, 1852)
 † Radix subinflata (d'Orbigny, 1852) 
 † Radix sublimosa (Sinzov, 1875)
 † Radix subovata (von Zieten, 1832) 
 † Radix zelli (Hörnes, 1856) 

Or instead perhaps:
 R. peregra = R. ovata = R. balthica
Taxa inquirenda
 Radix middendorffi (W. Dybowski, 1903) 
Species brought into synonymy
 Radix (Radix) dupuyana (Noulet, 1854): synonym of † Galba dupuyiana (Noulet, 1854)
 † Radix (Radix) hyaloleuca (Brusina, 1902): synonym of † Radix korlevici (Brusina, 1884) 
 † Radix (Radix) limosa (Linnaeus, 1758): synonym of  Radix balthica (Linnaeus, 1758)
 † Radix (Radix) peregra (Müller, 1774): synonym of Radix labiata (Rossmässler, 1835)
 Radix auriculatus Montfort, 1810: synonym of Radix auricularia (Linnaeus, 1758)
 Radix altus Macaleț, 2000: synonym of † Radix alta Macaleț, 2000
 † Radix amaradicus Macaleț, 2000: synonym of † Radix amaradica Macaleț, 2000
 Radix deydieri (Fontannes, 1878): synonym of † Radix cucuronensis (Fontannes, 1878)
 † Radix hyaloleuca (Brusina, 1902): synonym of † Radix korlevici (Brusina, 1884) 
 † Radix kuzmici (Brusina, 1897): synonym of † Boskovicia kuzmici Brusina, 1897 
 Radix ovata (Draparnaud, 1805): synonym of Radix balthica (Linnaeus, 1758)
 † Radix peregra (O. F. Müller, 1774): synonym of Radix labiata (Rossmässler, 1835)
 † Radix socialis Macaleț, 2000: synonym of † Radix macaleti Neubauer, Harzhauser, Kroh, Georgopoulou & Mandic, 2014

Parasites 
Species within the genus Radix are utilized as intermediate hosts by several different trematode species:
Trichobilharzia spp.
Fasciola hepatica
Fasciola gigantica
Fascioloides magna
Plagiorchis neomidis
Haplometra cylindracea
Echinostoma spp.

References 

 Vinarski V.M. (2013) One, two, or several? How many lymnaeid genera are there? Ruthenica 23(1): 41-58.

Lymnaeidae
Palearctic molluscs
Gastropod genera